Gershwin Live! is a 1982 live album by Sarah Vaughan, of music composed by George Gershwin, accompanied by the Los Angeles Philharmonic, conducted by Michael Tilson Thomas. The album was arranged by Marty Paich.

Vaughan's performance won her the Grammy Award for Best Jazz Vocal Performance, Female at the Grammy Awards of 1983.

Track listing
 Overture: Porgy and Bess Medley: "Summertime"/"It Ain't Necessarily So" (George Gershwin, DuBose Heyward, Ira Gershwin)/"I Loves You, Porgy" (G. Gershwin, I. Gershwin, D. Heyward) – 7:52
 Medley: "But Not for Me"/"Our Love Is Here to Stay"/"Embraceable You"/"Someone To Watch Over Me" – 9:39
 "Sweet and Low Down" – 3:36
 "Fascinating Rhythm" – 4:04
 "Do It Again" (Buddy DeSylva, G. Gershwin) – 5:29
 "My Man's Gone Now" (G. Gershwin, I. Gershwin, Heyward) – 5:51
 "The Man I Love" – 10:03
 Medley: "Nice Work If You Can Get It"/"They Can't Take That Away from Me"/"'S Wonderful"/"Swanee"/"Strike Up the Band" – 6:56
 Encore: "I've Got a Crush on You"/"A Foggy Day" –– 7:35

All songs composed by George Gershwin, with lyrics by Ira Gershwin, unless otherwise noted.

Personnel 
 Sarah Vaughan – vocals
 George Gaffney – piano
 Andy Simpkins – double bass
 Harold Jones – drums
 The Los Angeles Philharmonic – other instruments
 Michael Tilson Thomas – piano, conductor, co-arranger on "The Man I Love"
 Marty Paich – arranger

Footnotes 

1982 live albums
Albums arranged by Marty Paich
Columbia Records live albums
George and Ira Gershwin tribute albums
Grammy Award for Best Jazz Vocal Performance, Female
Sarah Vaughan live albums